Walter Richards may refer to:

Walter Richards (umpire) (1863–1917), English first-class cricketer and Test match umpire
Walter Richards (canoeist) (born 1942), American sprint canoer